Gebhart is a surname. Notable people with the surname include:

Charles Frederick Gebhart (1891–1942), American actor
Émile Gebhart (1839–1908), French academic and writer
Timo Gebhart (born 1989), German footballer
Thomas Gebhart (born 1971), German politician

See also
Gebhart factor, radiative heat transfer
Gebhart Tavern, museum in Miamisburg, Ohio
Gebhart v. Belton, American justice case
S.P. Gebhart House, US historic house in Pratt, Kansas